The Oelse is a river in the district Oder-Spree, Brandenburg, Germany. It is situated in the Schlaube Valley Nature Park and runs from the Möschensee (lake) in the east from Groß Muckrow (part of Friedland) to the river Spree near Beeskow. Its name derives from the sorbian ol'ša (English: alder tree).

See also
List of rivers of Brandenburg

Rivers of Brandenburg
Rivers of Germany